Xavier Barachet (born 19 November 1988) is a French handball player, two-time World champion and European champion with the French national team. Since 2006 he plays for Saint-Raphaël Var Handball in the Ligue Nationale de Handball.

On 1 January 2013, Barachet was made a Knight (Chevalier) of the Légion d'honneur.

Achievements
Ligue Nationale de Handball:
Runner-up: 2008, 2009, 2011
Coupe de France:
Finalist: 2009, 2011
Liga ASOBAL:
Runner-up: 2012/13
Copa del Rey:
Winner: 2012/13
Copa ASOBAL:
Finalist: 2013
Supercopa ASOBAL:
Finalist: 2012
IHF Super Globe:
Winner: 2012
World Championship:
Winner: 2009, 2011
European Championship:
Winner: 2010

References

External links
 Profile at Chambéry Savoie HB official website

1988 births
Chevaliers of the Légion d'honneur
French male handball players
Handball players at the 2012 Summer Olympics
Living people
Sportspeople from Nice
Olympic handball players of France
Olympic gold medalists for France
Olympic medalists in handball
Medalists at the 2012 Summer Olympics
European champions for France